The military ranks of Ukraine were created in March 1992 after Ukraine adopted the law "About Universal Military Duty and Military Service". The rank structure of the Ukrainian Armed Forces originally corresponded to the generic military rank structure of the Soviet Union. Since then the rank system has been overhauled and, as of 2022, follows a NATO standardization.

Ukrainian Armed Forces have two styles of ranks – army, which is used by ground forces as well as aerial forces, and naval – the Ukrainian Navy. Ukraine has eliminated the descriptor "of aviation" following the air force ranks and in 2016 the descriptor "guards" following the rank of a serviceman of a guards unit, formation or ship was officially abolished. The rank of a serviceman of the legal, medical or veterinary professions shall be followed by the words “of Justice,” “of the medical service,” or “of the veterinary service,” to their respective ranks. The rank of a citizen having reserve or retired status shall be followed by the words “reserve” or “retired,” respectively.

Rank insignia currently in force

Introduction of STANAG 2116 ranks 
On 17 October 2019, the parliament of Ukraine approved a change to the rank structure of enlisted in order to conform to the NATO STANAG 2116 standardization. The change was implemented with the 2020 military reform. This resulted in the abolition of the rank of General of the Army of Ukraine by Law nr. 680-IX, on 1 October 2020.

Ground Forces, Territorial Defense, Special Operations and Air Assault Forces 
 Officers

Other Ranks and NCOs

Air Force 
 Officers

Other Ranks and NCOs

Navy

Fleet forces 
 Officers

Other Ranks and NCOs

Marine Corps, Naval Aviation and Shore Establishment 
Officers

Other Ranks and NCOs

Former rank systems

1991 System
The independent Ukraine inherited the ranks of the Soviet Union. But there were some changes.
The rank of "" was changed to the "senior soldier" and the rank of private was changed to the "soldier". Also, marshall ranks and the category of praporshchyks/midshipmen were abolished.

Officer ranks

Enlisted ranks

Proposed system 2009

The first graduates of the Training Centre for Sergeants of the Armed Forces of Ukraine in Kharkiv at once became the first professional sergeants, who clothed shoulder straps with a fundamentally new insignia.

This innovation was aimed at the NATO standards. Until 2009, Ukrainian soldiers used a military rank insignia of the Soviet model. Before the innovation, for example, a Ukrainian major general could be confused with an ordinary major, as they both had only one star on the Soviet straps. The new straps of major general have two stars, like in the most NATO countries. Also, the new system of military insignia makes possible to introduce new ranks, such as brigade general and new types of sergeant. New straps of generals have crossed maces (bulawas), which are kleinods (regalia) of Hetman, colonel and Otaman of the Host.

These experimental insignia never came into wide use and were abandoned shortly afterwards. Up until 2015 the Armed Forces kept using the Soviet-style insignia and rank system, albeit in the case of the Ground Forces and the Air Force the old insignia stayed with the officer corps while 2009 proposal for NCO insignia saw wider adoption and thus replaced the Soviet insignia.

Sergeant major (the post of chief sergeant) 
Chief sergeant of a branch of the armed forces is a projected post in Ukraine. The chief sergeant is a person who knows almost all issues what relate to non-commissioned officers. Therefore, the chief sergeant of a branch of the armed forces may be adviser to the head of the appropriate level - for example, the commander of land forces of Ukraine. Now, the Ministry of Defence is working to change the statute and, possibly, the new post was projected to be introduced in three or four years from 2009.
In airmobile units there are also posts of chief sergeant of the division and chief sergeant of the brigade.

System 2009

System 2016
Late July 2015 the President Petro Poroshenko stated that Ukraine needed to introduce new military ranks that meet Ukrainian military traditions "and corresponds to the structure of NATO military ranks". Still, the system initially proposed just replicated the Soviet hierarchy of military ranks and had no relation to the NATO system whatsoever - the only innovation being of a purely decorative character, namely, the appearance and composition of the shoulder strap insignia.

The reform of 2016 which finally emerged will, at long last, bring the rank insignia of the Ukrainian armed forces in line with the rank systems of its NATO partners and the rest of the world, while also, if successful, honor the traditions of Cossacks in Ukraine and the Ukrainian independence armies, the Ukrainian People's Army of the Russian Civil War and the Ukrainian War of Independence and the Second World War-era Ukrainian Insurgent Army, adapting their rank insignias to suit a modern Ukrainian Armed Forces in the 21st century.

While option 1 uses the old system but with new other ranks insignia, option 2 uses a US-style insignia for enlisted ranks and NCOs plus the Brigadier general rank. In both cases, all officers use pips while the General of the Army of Ukraine has the crossed Bulawa as insignia. Early proposals had the General of the Army shoulder insignia to use the state coat of arms.

In 2016, new rank insignia designs were issued for the Navy, which included both shoulder and sleeve insignia for all ranks.

Uniforms using the revised system debuted on August 24, 2016, as Ukraine marked the silver jubilee of nationhood, while matching those of its future NATO partner countries should it officially join the organization it pays tribute to the many Ukrainians who made countless sacrifices for the country through the centuries.  In a break with the Soviet era past, the stars used for officers' ranking were replaced with British military style diamonds - inspired by those used by the Ground Forces during the Ukrainian State of 1918.

By 2017, the insignia of the Navy will begin to be utilized, the final design being a unified set shoulder and sleeve rank insignia similar to many NATO and European Union naval forces with distinctions:

Western styled sleeve insignia used for officers of the naval branch
Dark boards with Army-styled insignia for officers of the marine division, naval aviation and shore establishment commands

On May 30, 2019, the Verkhovna Rada adopted as a Basis the Bill No. 10181 on the introduction of sergeant ranks in the Armed Forces of Ukraine in accordance with the column "NATO Code" in accordance with STANAG 2116. The bill aims to improve Ukraine's legislation on military service with the aim of streamlining the disciplinary powers of officials, settlement of some issues of daily activity, determination of the rights and duties of the sergeant (officers) and some other officials of the Armed Forces of Ukraine.

It is proposed to introduce a new scale of military ranks. In addition, separation of the sergeant and senior officers into junior and senior ranks (and general/flag officers for the officer corps) is foreseen, as well as the introduction of a sergeant major rank to the armed forces.

It is also envisaged to change the limitation age for military service for sergeants, which eliminates the problem when a sergeant under the law can not reach retirement due to a conflict between the current legislation.

Historical ranks

1918–1921
Officer ranks

Other ranks

1940–1949
Officer ranks

Other ranks

See also 
 Military ranks of the Soviet Union
 Ukrainian Armed Forces branch insignia

References

External links
 ВІЙСЬКОВІ ЗВАННЯ ТА ВІЙСЬКОВІ РАНГИ ЗБРОЙНИХ ФОРМУВАНЬ УКРАЇНИ (Institute of History of Ukraine)
 Ukrainian Armed Forces 2007 White Book p.53
 
 
 

 
Ukraine
Ranks